Haleakalā National Park is an American national park located on the island of Maui in the state of Hawaii. The land was designated a national park in 1976 and its boundaries expanded in 2005.

History
Haleakalā was originally part of Hawaii National Park along with the volcanoes of Mauna Loa and Kilauea on the island of Hawaii, created in 1916. Hawaiʻi Volcanoes National Park was made into a separate national park in 1961 by Bill S. 3623. The park area was designated an International Biosphere Reserve in 1980.  The name Haleakalā is Hawaiian for "house of the sun."  According to a local legend, the demigod Maui imprisoned the sun here in order to lengthen the day. The Hawaiian National Park Language Correction Act of 2000 was proposed to observe the Hawaiian spelling, but it did not become law.

The park features the dormant Haleakalā (East Maui) Volcano, which last erupted sometime between 1480 and 1600 AD. The park is divided into two distinct sections: the summit area and the coastal Kipahulu area.

Haleakalā National Park has been a part of the Pacific West Region since its inception in 1961.

Summit

An extremely winding but well maintained road leads up the mountain. The summit area includes Haleakalā Crater, the summit of the volcano, and the area surrounding the summit. This part of the park is accessed by Hawaii State Road 378. There is a visitor center, with parking and restrooms, near the summit.  At the summit itself is another parking lot and a simple observatory without facilities.

The main feature of this part of the park is Haleakalā Crater which, despite its name, is geologically an erosional valley. The interior of the crater is dotted by numerous volcanic features, including large cinder cones. Two main trails lead into the crater from the summit area: the Halemau'u and Sliding Sands trails. Hikers in the crater can stay in one of three cabins.

Visitors frequently come to the summit of the volcano to watch the sunrise and/or sunset. One attraction of the park is Hosmer's Grove, a unique forest of trees including deodar (Cedrus deodara) from the Himalayas, sugi (Cryptomeria japonica) from Japan, eucalyptus from Australia, and several species from North America (pine, spruce, cypress, fir, and others). Native plants and trees are also present in the forest but are not common due to the little light available (because of the taller alien trees).

The park is known for its volcanic features, its long scenic drive with numerous overlooks, and the unusually clear views of the night sky available. Haleakalā is one of the best places in the United States for amateur astronomy, and binoculars and telescopes are available for rent from many local merchants. Nēnē (Hawaiian geese, Branta sandvicensis) can also be seen in their natural habitat in Haleakalā Crater. Although nēnē died out entirely in the park, in 1946 they were re-introduced with the help of the Boy Scouts, who carried young birds into the crater in their backpacks.

Climate
At its lowest, near the ocean, the National Park has a tropical rainforest climate bordering a tropical monsoon climate. However, as altitudes progresses the climate becomes oceanic/Mediterranean, reaching, at the very top of Haleakalā, an alpine climate.

Issues

Feral ungulates 
Grazing and rooting feral deer, goats, and pigs have been destroying native vegetation. They trample the ground and break down the native plants and cause soil erosion. Biodiversity has been compromised and is negatively affecting the groundwater reserve.

Endangered species 

The park is home to a number of endangered species, including nēnē, kiwikiu, ʻakohekohe,  and Haleakala silversword. The Park Service is taking steps to prevent these species from going extinct.

Deferred Maintenance  
As of 2018, the Park has deferred maintenance valued at $24,382,236. 49.8% of this number is from unpaved roads. The rest of the deferred maintenance cost range from trails, water systems, buildings, and campgrounds. To help combat this problem the Haleakalā friends group runs monthly service trips. This includes cleaning and scrubbing the cabins, the eradication of thistles, blackberries, and heterothecas. They also work on improving the nene habitat by removing invasive grass.

Kipahulu

The second section of the park is the Kipahulu section. Visitors cannot drive directly to this section from the summit area; they must take a winding coastal road that travels around the windward coast of the island. This part of the park lies within the lower part of Kipahulu Valley. It is separated from the summit area of the park by the upper portion of the valley. This area is designated the Kipahulu Valley Biological Reserve and is closed to the public to preserve the native plant and animal species in this fragile rainforest.

This section of the park features more than two dozen pools along Palikea Stream in the gulch called Oheo. These pools contain rare native freshwater fish. Visitors may choose to swim in these pools, or they may choose to hike a trail that takes visitors up to the base of Waimoku Falls.

Flora and fauna

More endangered species live in Haleakalā National Park than any other national park in the United States. Once traveling to this part of the island became more frequent, native species were destroyed. One example is the āhinahina (Haleakalā silversword, Argyroxiphium sandwicense macrocephalum), which formerly covered Haleakalā Mountain to a degree where the mountain looked as if it were covered with snow. Other endangered species include the endangered Haleakalā schiedea (Schiedea haleakalensis). Over 850 species of plants grow in the park and there are four endemic species of geraniums that are also found in the park.

The park is home to many tardigrade species surviving in the extreme environment near the mountain summit. In the 1980s, local biologist Sam Gon III discovered 31 tardigrade species here and described Haleakalā as the "richest place on Earth for tardigrades".

The park is also home to 3 endemic Hawaiian Honeycreepers only on east Maui. These include Maui Alauahio, Akohekohe, and the Critically Endangered Kiwikiu with around 200 members left.

Haleakalā Observatory

Haleakalā Observatory is an observation site located near the visitor center. It lies above the tropical inversion layer and so experiences excellent viewing conditions and very clear skies. For over 40 years, the University of Hawaii Institute for Astronomy has managed this site, conducting dedicated astrophysical experiments. One of its missions, the Maui Space Surveillance System (MSSS), tracks satellites and debris orbiting the Earth. The buildings are on a gated road just past the summit and are not within the park boundary.

Superintendents of Haleakalā National Park 
The first Superintendent of Haleakalā National Park was John Stratton. The current one is Natalie Gates, she has been in this position since 2013. Although, there is not a full list of Superintendents on public record, the following has been reported. 

John W. Stratton 10/19/1961 - 5/11/1963

Neal G. Guse 7/01/1963 - 7/15/1967

Forrest M. Benson Jr. 8/27/1967 - 6/14/1969

Lynn H. Thompson 6/29/1969 - 11/16/1970

Russell Cahill 1/17/1971 - 4/27/1974

Hugo H. Huntzinger 5/26/1974 - 12/19/1987

Peter G. Sanchez 12/20/1987 - 3/26/1988

Donald W. Reeser 3/27/1988 -        ???

?????

Sarah Creachbuam         2009 – 2012

????

Natalie Gates    3/2013- Present

Gallery

See also

 List of national parks of the United States

References

External links

 Haleakalā National Park – National Park Service
 Friends of Haleakalā National Park – nonprofit organization
 Haleakalā Biosphere Reserve (archive) – UNESCO website
 East Maui Watershed Partnership – nonprofit organization for cultural interpretation and restoration in Kipahulu district of Haleakalā National Park
 
 

 
National parks in Hawaii
Protected areas of Maui
Protected areas established in 1916
1916 establishments in Hawaii
Maui
Volcanism of Hawaii
Historic American Engineering Record in Hawaii